Ridgeline Open Space is a public park located within The Meadows neighborhood in Castle Rock, Colorado along the Front Range of the Rocky Mountains.

Wildlife and vegetation 
 Mammals that can be found in this area include the American badger, American black bear, bobcat, coyote, Colorado chipmunk, gray fox, red fox, mountain cottontail rabbit, mountain lion, mule deer, pocket gopher, porcupine, and skunk.
 Birds that can be found in this area include the golden eagle, peregrine falcon, sharp-shinned hawk, black-billed magpie, red-tailed hawk, pinyon jay and western tanager.
Trees that can be found in the area include the Gambel oak, ponderosa pine, and pinyon pine.

Gallery

Map

References

External links
The Meadows Link
Visit Castle Rock
Town of Castle Rock
Castle Rock Chamber of Commerce
Castle Rock Economic Development Council (CREDCO)

Castle Rock, Colorado
Protected areas of Douglas County, Colorado
Parks in Colorado